The 1984 Cornell Big Red football team was an American football team that represented Cornell University during the 1984 NCAA Division I-AA football season. Cornell tied for second-worst in the Ivy League. 

In its second season under head coach Maxie Baughan, the team compiled a 2–7 record and was outscored 161 to 96. Team captains were Steve Garrison, Mark Miller, Scott Sidman and John Tagliaferri. 

Cornell's 2–5 conference record tied for sixth place in the Ivy League standings. The Big Red were outscored 116 to 82 by Ivy opponents. 

Cornell played its home games at Schoellkopf Field in Ithaca, New York.

Schedule

References

Cornell
Cornell Big Red football seasons
Cornell Big Red football